The Labour Party was a political party in Singapore.

History
The party was established on 23 March 1948 by several trade unionists. Its first electoral test was the April 1949 local elections, in which it received 13% of the vote, winning one of the 18 seats. In the next local elections in December the party's vote share increased to 43%, although it only won two of the six seats. The party won one seat in the 1950 elections.

The party contested the 1951 general elections, receiving 30% of the vote and winning two of the nine elected seats. In the local elections later in the year, the party won three seats.

However, the party saw several splits in the early 1950s, leading to the formation of the Labour Front. It won only one seat in the 1952 local elections and none in the 1953 elections. By the 1955 general elections the party had lost both its MPs, and received less than 1% of the vote, failing to win a seat.

The party did not contest the 1959 general elections, and after the Societies Ordinance came into force in 1960, it failed to re-register.

Election results

Legislative elections

Municipal elections

References

Defunct political parties in Singapore
Political parties established in 1948
1948 establishments in Singapore
Labour parties